Ziteng Road is a station on the branch line of Line 10 of the Shanghai Metro. It is close to the Shanghai Metro Museum.

References

Railway stations in Shanghai
Shanghai Metro stations in Minhang District
Railway stations in China opened in 2010
Line 10, Shanghai Metro